Kgalagadi Breweries (Pty) Limited are brewers based in Gaborone, Botswana. They produce lager beers, traditional beers, bottled water and soft drinks under license. The brewery started out as Prinz Brau, with two brands, Prinz Brau and Prinz Deluxe.

Corporate timeline
 1960s - Botswana Breweries Limited is started in Francistown to brew Chibuku traditional beer.
 1970s - Sechaba Brewery Holdings Limited (SBHL) was set up to hold investments in the beverage sector.
 1977 - SAB acquires management control of KBL (40% equity stake). KBL begins bottling Coca-Cola products.
 1989 - SBHL is listed on the Botswana Stock Exchange.
 1995 - New soft drink bottling line built in Gaborone.
 2009 - KBL launches St Louis Export.
 2013 - Botswana Breweries Ltd, was amalgamated with KBL.

Botswana Breweries Limited
Botswana Breweries has four plants in Lobatse, Gaborone, Palapye and Francistown.

The products include
 traditional opaque beer Chibuku - made from sorghum and maize.
 Phafana (opaque beer)
 non-alcoholic beverage Keone Mooka Mageu.

Product packs include a straight-sided screw-top 1 litre carton. A 750ml pack and a draught.

Ownership
The shares of Kgalagadi Breweries Limited are privately held. The shareholding in the company's stock as at December 31, 2012 was as depicted in the table below:

 By virtue of its shareholding in Kgalagadi Breweries Limited and Sechaba Brewery Holdings of 40% and 16.8% respectively, SABMiller's total direct and indirect shareholding in Kgalagadi Breweries Limited and Botswana Breweries Ltd is 50.08%. This makes both companies subsidiaries of SABMiller and associates of Sechaba Brewery Holdings.

Alcohol levy
In 2008, Ian Khama proposed an alcohol levy of 70% to reduce alcoholism in Botswana. There was resistance and the levy was imposed at 30%. By November 2009, the levy created the desired effect, causing declines of 35% in lager sales volume and 14% in traditional beer sale volumes. In response to the negative statutory environment, the brewery cut costs and maximised efficiencies. Non-alcoholic brands were developed to compensate for the fall in traditional brands. In six month report (September 2013) the levy was at 45% and the decrease in alcohol brands had dropped a further 8%. New brands developed include Source bottled water and Keone Mooka Mageu.

Brands
 St Louis (1989) 3.5% ABV
 St Louis Export 4.7% ABV
 Castle Lager 5% ABV
 Castle Lite 4% ABV
 Ohlsson's Lager
 Lion Lager 5% ABV
 Carling Black Label 5.5% ABV

 Traditional Beers (Opaque beers)
 Chibuku
 Phafana

 Non-alcoholic brands
 Source Water - accredited by the Botswana Bureau of Standards (BOBS)
 Bonaqua Still Water
 Keone Mooka Mageu - a traditional fermented porridge

 Soft Drinks
 Coca-Cola
 Coke Zero
 Fanta Orange
 Fanta Grape
 Fanta Pineapple
 Sprite
 Iron Brew
 Ginger Stoney
 Pine Nut
 Minute Maid
 Cream-Soda
 Burn
 Powerade

Social responsibility programs
Kickstart is an entrepreneur development programme for 18- to 30-year-olds providing mentorship and training to over 107 young entrepreneurs. 80% of participants are still trading.
Project Tshelang (Stay alive) launched in 2001 aims to prevent new infections and provide employees and their families with awareness and counselling programs. There are currently 74 trained and active peer educators.

References

Breweries of Africa
SABMiller
Food and drink companies of Botswana
Companies listed on the Botswana Stock Exchange
Sorghum
Botswana companies